South B is an estate based in Makadara Division in Nairobi, Kenya. It consists of middle class houses ranging from the tiled roofed Plainsview Estate to the metal roofed Mariakani Estate. also it has Diamond Park I and Diamond Park II Estate in likoni road, It is famed for its number 11 matatus (Minibuses - Public Transport PSVs). It has a shopping centre and Capital centre Mall. The houses there are in high demand due to its closeness to the Nairobi Central Business District. South B is located north of the South C estate.

South B has other housing communities ranging from stand alone houses and high rise apartments such as Balozi, Hazina, SanaSana, Golden Gate, Sore Drive, Githeri Drive and Rise. Famous health facilities in the area include The Mater Misericordiae Hospital, Mariakani Cottage Hospital, South B Hospital and South B Dental Care.

South B hosts a number of educational institutions from tertiary, high school and primary schools. Among the top of the list are Kenya Institute of Mass Communication (KIMC), Nairobi South Primary, Our Lady Queen of Peace Secondary School and Our Lady of Mercy Primary School.

The Mariakani Cottage Hospital is located in South B. South B is also home to the Winners' Chapel church which is the largest church span in East and Central Africa at the time of writing (04/06/2015).

Highway Secondary School is in South B.

References 

 

Suburbs of Nairobi